Tahar may refer to:

People with the surname
Amor Ben Tahar (born 1969), retired Tunisian football player
 Arcandra Tahar (born 1970), 5th Deputy Minister of Energy and Mineral Resources of Indonesia (2016-), 16th Minister of Energy and Mineral Resources of Indonesia (2016)
Aymen Tahar (born 1989), Algerian football player

People with the given name
Tahar Ben Jelloun (born 1944), Moroccan poet and writer
Tahar Bekri (born 1951), Tunisian poet
Tahar Djaout (1954–1993), Algerian journalist, poet, and fiction writer
Tahar Douis, Moroccan wrestler of alligators
Tahar El Khalej (born 1968), retired Moroccan football player
Tahar Haddad (1899–1935), Tunisian author, scholar and reformer
Tahar Lamri, (born 1958), Algerian writer
Tahar Mansouri (born 1965), retired Tunisian marathon runner
Tahar Tamsamani (born 1980), boxer from Morocco, who participated in three Olympic tournaments

See also
Stade Tahar Zoughari, multi-use stadium in Relizane, Algeria